Sfumato is a painting technique for softening the transition between colours, mimicking an area beyond what the human eye is focusing on, or the out-of-focus plane. It is one of the canonical painting modes of the Renaissance. Leonardo da Vinci was the most prominent practitioner of sfumato, based on his research in optics and human vision, and his experimentation with the camera obscura. He introduced it and implemented it in many of his works, including the Virgin of the Rocks and in his famous painting of the Mona Lisa. He described sfumato as "without lines or borders, in the manner of smoke".

According to the theory of the art historian Marcia B. Hall, which has gained considerable acceptance, sfumato is one of four modes of painting colours available to Italian High Renaissance painters, along with cangiante, chiaroscuro, and unione.

Etymology

The word sfumato comes from the Italian language and is derived from fumo ("smoke", "fume"). Sfumato translated into English means soft, vague, or blurred. In Italian, the word is used often as an adjective (such as biondo sfumato for pale blonde hair) or as a verb (l'affare è sfumato would mean "the deal has gone up in smoke"). The use of the term (unlike some others) dates back to the period when da Vinci introduced it.

Technique 
The technique is a fine shading meant to produce a soft transition between colours and tones, in order to achieve a more believable image. It is most often used by making subtle gradations that do not include lines or borders, from areas of light to areas of dark. The technique was used not only to give an elusive and illusionistic rendering of the human face, but also to create rich atmospheric effects. Leonardo da Vinci described the technique as blending colours, without the use of lines or borders "in the manner of smoke".

Practitioners
Besides Leonardo and his followers, the Leonardeschi, who often used it heavily, other prominent practitioners of sfumato included Correggio, Raphael, and Giorgione. Raphael's Madonna of the Meadow is a famous example, particularly around Mary's face. The Leonardeschi include Bernardino Luini and Funisi.

Notes

External links

Leonardo da Vinci, master draftsman, exhibition catalog fully online as PDF from The Metropolitan Museum of Art, which contains material on this technique (see index)

Visual arts terminology
Italian words and phrases
Painting techniques